CenturyTel of Port Aransas, Inc. is a telephone operating company providing local telephone services in Texas owned by CenturyLink.

The company was established in 1955.

On August 3, 2021, Lumen announced its sale of its local telephone assets in 20 states to Apollo Global Management, including Texas.

References

Lumen Technologies
Communications in Texas
Telecommunications companies of the United States
Telecommunications companies established in 1955
American companies established in 1955 
1955 establishments in Texas